Arianna Errigo (born 6 June 1988) is an Italian left-handed foil and sabre fencer.

Errigo is a nine-time team European champion, two-time individual European champion, six-time team world champion, and two-time individual world champion.
Known for her aggressive and fast fencing, she is regarded as one of the greatest fencers of all time.

A three-time Olympian, Errigo is a 2021 team Olympic bronze medalist, 2012 team Olympic champion, and 2012 individual Olympic silver medalist. Errigo competed in the 2012 London Olympic Games, the 2016 Rio de Janeiro Olympic Games, and the 2020 Tokyo Olympic Games.

Errigo is an athlete of the Centro Sportivo Carabinieri.

Biography
In the women's individual foil at the 2012 Summer Olympics she denied Valentina Vezzali of her fourth successive gold medal in the competition by defeating her 15–12 in the semi-finals. She went on to win the silver medal in the event, losing in extra time to Elisa Di Francisca.

At the 2013 and 2014 World Championships, Errigo won 2 consecutive gold medals in the individual event.

After the 2016 Rio de Janeiro Olympic Games, where she failed to win a medal, Errigo announced an interest in qualifying for both foil and sabre at the 2020 Tokyo Olympic Games. She later won a silver medal at the sabre grand prix in Cancún, Mexico, in December 2017.

Medal Record

Olympic Games

World Championship

European Championship

Grand Prix

World Cup

Honours and awards
: Commendatore Ordine al Merito della Repubblica Italiana (Italian for: Commander Order of Merit of the Italian Republic), 5 June 2013.

References

External links

Arianna Errigo at the European Fencing Confederation
 

1988 births
Living people
Italian female fencers
Italian female foil fencers
Olympic fencers of Italy
Olympic gold medalists for Italy
Olympic silver medalists for Italy
Olympic bronze medalists for Italy
Olympic medalists in fencing
Fencers at the 2012 Summer Olympics
Fencers at the 2016 Summer Olympics
Fencers at the 2020 Summer Olympics
Medalists at the 2012 Summer Olympics
Medalists at the 2020 Summer Olympics
World Fencing Championships medalists
Commanders of the Order of Merit of the Italian Republic
Fencers of Centro Sportivo Carabinieri
Sportspeople from Monza
21st-century Italian women